The Scoot-Mobile prototype was built mostly from aircraft parts, manufactured by the Norman Anderson Co in Corunna, Michigan in 1946.  The Scoot-Mobile was a 3-wheeler with automatic gear change, 3 wheel brakes, and could reach a top speed of 40 mph.

References
 

Defunct motor vehicle manufacturers of the United States
Motor vehicle manufacturers based in Michigan
Defunct manufacturing companies based in Michigan